Geiny Carmela Pájaro Guzmán is a Colombian inline speedskater who has won medals at the Inline Speed Skating World Championships, Pan American Games and World Games.

Career
Pájaro was one of the most outstanding athletes of the Colombian delegation at the 2019 Pan American Games held in Lima, Peru, winning a gold medal in the 500-meter category and a silver medal in the 300-meter time trial category.

References

External links
 

Date of birth missing (living people)
Living people
Colombian female speed skaters
Inline speed skaters
Roller speed skaters at the 2019 Pan American Games
Pan American Games gold medalists for Colombia
Pan American Games silver medalists for Colombia
Pan American Games medalists in roller skating
Medalists at the 2019 Pan American Games
Competitors at the 2017 World Games
Competitors at the 2022 World Games
World Games gold medalists
21st-century Colombian women
Year of birth missing (living people)